Barna Tánczos (born 25 May 1976) is a Romanian politician who has been serving as Minister of Environment, Water and Forests in the Cîțu Cabinet and Ciucă Cabinet since 23 December 2020.

References 

Living people
1976 births
People from Miercurea Ciuc
21st-century Romanian politicians
Romanian Ministers of the Environment
Democratic Union of Hungarians in Romania politicians